San Juan, Puerto Rico, held an election for mayor on November 4, 1980. It was held as part of the 1980 Puerto Rican general election. It saw the reelection of incumbent mayor Hernán Padilla, a member of the New Progressive Party.

Nominees
Celeste Benitez (Popular Democratic Party)
Hernán Padilla (New Progressive Party), former member of the Puerto Rico House of Representatives
Lucía A. Romero (Puerto Rican Socialist Party)
Roberto Aponte Toro (Puerto Rican Independence Party)

Results

References

1980
San Juan, Puerto Rico mayoral
San Juan, Puerto Rico